Reid Lake is a natural lake in South Dakota, in the United States.

Reid Lake has the name of James Reid, a pioneer who settled at the lake in the 1880s.

See also
List of lakes in South Dakota

References

Lakes of South Dakota
Lakes of Clark County, South Dakota